"Forever Now"  is a song by British musical group Level 42. It was the first single from their 10th studio album, Forever Now (1994), in February 1994. It reached number 19 on the UK Single Chart and charted in four other countries.

Personnel
 Mark King – bass, vocals
 Mike Lindup – keyboards, vocals
 Phil Gould – drums
 Wally Badarou – keyboards
 Danny Blume – guitars
 Gary Barnacle – saxophones
 John Thirkell, Derek Watkins, Stuart Brooks – trumpets
 Richard Edwards – trombone

References

Level 42 songs
1994 singles
1994 songs
RCA Records singles
Songs written by Frank Musker
Songs written by Mark King (musician)
Songs written by Richard Darbyshire